Andreas Schlüter (1659 – c. June 1714) was a German baroque sculptor and architect, active in the Holy Roman Empire of the German Nation, the Polish–Lithuanian Commonwealth, and the Russian Tsardom.

Biography
Andreas Schlüter was born probably in Hamburg. His early life is obscure as at least three different persons of that name are documented. The records of St. Michaelis Church, Hamburg show that an Andreas Schlüter, son of sculptor Gerhart Schlüter, had been baptized there on 22 May 1664. Documents from Danzig/Gdańsk (Royal Prussia) reported that an Andreas Schlüter (senior) had worked 1640–1652 in Danzig's Jopengasse lane (today's ulica Piwna). Possibly born in 1640, an Andres Schliter is recorded as apprentice on 9 May 1656 by the mason's guild. Other sources state 1659 as year of birth.

He probably did spend several years abroad as Journeyman. His first work, in 1675, may have been epitaphs of the Dukes Sambor and Mestwin in the dome of Pelplin monastery.

Schlüter's first known work was the decoration of the facade of the Danzig Royal Chapel, in 1681. He later created statues for King John III Sobieski's Wilanów Palace in Warsaw and sepulchral sculptures in Zhovkva. In 1689, he moved to Warsaw and made the pediment reliefs and sculptural work of Krasiński Palace.

Schlüter was invited to Berlin in 1694 by Eberhard von Danckelmann to work as court sculptor at the armory (Zeughaus) for Elector Frederick III. His sculpted decorations are a masterpiece of baroque expression and pathos. While the more visible reliefs on the outside had to praise fighting, the statues of dying warriors in the interior denounced war and gave an indication of his pacifist religious beliefs (he is said to have been a Mennonite). Travelling through Italy in 1696, he studied the work of masters like Michelangelo Buonarroti and Gian Lorenzo Bernini.

Schlüter also worked as an architect and built many state buildings in Berlin in his role as "Hofbaumeister" (Court Architect), which he lost when one tower showed signs of a weak fundament. He also served as director of the Prussian Academy of Arts from 1702 to 1704, after which he began concentrating on sculpting again, as "Hofbildhauer" (Court Sculptor). His most important equestrian sculpture is that of the "Great Elector", Frederick William of Brandenburg, cast in 1708 and placed at "Lange Brücke" near the Berlin City Palace, now situated in the honor court before Charlottenburg Palace.

The Berlin City Palace, and many of his works, were partially destroyed by bombing in World War II and by the subsequent Communist regime. A similar fate probably befell the Amber Room, made between 1701 and 1709, Schlüter's most famous work of architecture.

In 1713 Schlüter's fame brought him to work for Tsar Peter the Great in Saint Petersburg, where he died of an illness after creating several designs. Together with Johann Friedrich Braunstein, he designed the Grand Palace and Monplaisir Palace in Peterhof Palace Complex. Also the city's oldest building, Kikin Hall, and the reliefs at the Summer Palace are attributed to him. This way he became an important figure of Petrine Baroque.

Extant works
Facade of the Royal Chapel, Gdańsk, 1681
Sculptures on the facade of Wilanów Palace, Warsaw, after 1681
Sculptures on the pediment of Krasiński Palace, Warsaw, 1682–83, 1689–1693
Epitaph of Adam Zygmunt Konarski, St. Mary's Cathedral of the Assumption, Frombork near Gdańsk, after 1683
Altar and crucifix in church, Węgrów near Warsaw, 1688–1690
Altar in Czerniaków church, Warsaw, 1690
Portrait bishop Jan Małachowski in Wawel Cathedral, Kraków 1693
Aepulchral sculptures of the Sobieski family, Zhovkva near Lviv, 1692–93
Equestrian statue of Elector Frederick William, courtyard of Charlottenburg Palace, Berlin, 1689–1703, with a copy in the Berlin Bode-Museum
Amber Room (reconstruction) in the Catherine Palace of Tsarskoye Selo near Saint Petersburg, 1701
Pulpit, St. Mary's Church, Berlin, 1703
Sarcophagi of Friedrich I and Sophia Charlotte, King and Queen in Prussia in the Berlin Cathedral

References

External links

 
 
 
 
 Biography, by Heinz Ladendorf, 1935
 Article in Morgenpost newspaper
 dhm.de: Schlüter bio at Zeughaus
 English site about Kikin's Palace (Mansion House)

1664 births
1714 deaths
German Baroque architects
Polish Baroque architects
Russian Baroque architects
17th-century German architects
18th-century German architects
German Baroque sculptors
Polish Baroque sculptors
Polish male sculptors
Ukrainian Baroque sculptors
17th-century German sculptors
18th-century German sculptors
18th-century German male artists
German male sculptors
17th-century Russian sculptors
18th-century sculptors from the Russian Empire
Russian male sculptors
Artists from Gdańsk
Architects from Hamburg
People from Royal Prussia